Del cuplé al tango is a 1958 Argentine film directed by Julio Saraceni  and starring Virginia Luque and Tito Lusiardo.

Cast
  Virginia Luque
  Tito Lusiardo
  Osvaldo Miranda
  Fernando Siro
  José Comellas
  Rodolfo Salerno
  Juan Carlos Galván
  Orlando Marconi
  René Jolivet
  Roberto Bordoni
  Gloria Ugarte
  Cristina Berys

References

External links
 

1958 films
1950s Spanish-language films
Argentine black-and-white films
Films directed by Julio Saraceni
1958 musical comedy films
Tango films
1950s Argentine films